Koutsouras (Κουτσουράς) is a village in Lasithi regional unit, in Crete, Greece  22 kilometers east of Ierapetra. Its population is 818 (2001 est.). It was the headquarters of the municipality of Makry Gialos (Dimos Makry Gialou) and is the biggest village in the region. Key economic activities include agriculture and tourism. It has nice beaches and a golf course is due to be built over the next five years. The coast is rocky and there are beautiful pebble beaches with crystal clear waters. Today it is the seat of Makry Gialos municipal unit and part of Ierapetra municipality.

Makry Gialos